The University of Gabès is a public university located in southern Tunisia with headquarters in Gabès.

Campuses 
The university has two main campuses in Gabès and another major one in the city of Medenine, south of Gabès.

Omar Khattab campus 
The largest campus of the university is in a somewhat isolated southern part of the city near Erriadh suburb. Close to this campus is the largest sport complex in Gabès where some facilities are shared with the university. The campus is very close to the main road leading to the airport and tourist city of Matamata which is a favorite destination for students' weekend trips.

City Center campus 
This campus is in downtown Gabès and hosts the University Cultural Center.

Institutions

Faculties 
 Faculty of Science: One of the largest in Tunisia and the largest in personnel after ENIG

Schools and institutes 
 National Engineering School of Gabès (ENIG)
 Higher Institute of Computer Sciences and Multimedia
 Higher Institute of Applied Biology
 Higher Institute of Juridical Studies
 Higher Institute of Arts and Crafts
 Higher Institute of Management
 Higher Institute of Languages
 Higher Institute of Applied Sciences and Technology
 Higher Institute of Water Sciences and Technologies
 Higher Institute of Industrial Systems
 Higher Institute of Applied Studies in Humanities.

National Engineering School
The National Engineering School of Gabès or ENIG, was founded in 1975. The school has five independent departments: 
 Chemical Process Engineering
 Civil Engineering
 Electrical-Automatic Engineering
 Communications and Network Engineering
 Mechanical Engineering

Research institution 
 Arid Zones Institute

Academics

Degrees 
The university offers the following degrees:
 Engineering (5 years)
 Maîtrise (4 years)
 Universitaire (3 years)
 Technicien Supérieur (2 to 3 years)

The university offers some postgraduate degrees:
 Master (6 years)
 PhD

Notable staff 

 Afwa Thameur - plant scientist

See also

List of schools in Tunisia
List of universities in Tunisia

References

External links
Engineering School website

2003 establishments in Tunisia
Gabès
Gabes